Sidalcea calycosa is a species of flowering plant in the mallow family known by the common names annual checkerbloom, checker mallow, and vernal pool checkerbloom.

Distribution
The plant is endemic to California, along the North Coast and adjacent Northern California Coast Ranges from Mendocino County to Marin County in the northern San Francisco Bay Area, and in sections of the western Sierra Nevada foothills from Butte County south into Tulare County.

It grows in wetland habitats, including marshes and vernal pools, in oak woodland and chaparral openings, grasslands, and coastal salt marsh plant communities.

Description
Despite its common name it may be annual or perennial, depending on the subspecies. The leaves have blades deeply divided into narrow linear lobes, almost divided into leaflets.

The inflorescence is a dense, showy panicle of several flowers each with five pink, purplish, or white petals up to 2.5 centimeters long. The bloom period is April through September.

Subspecies
The two subspecies are:
Sidalcea calycosa ssp. calycosa — annual, blooms March to June, below .
Sidalcea calycosa ssp. rhizomata — Point Reyes checkerbloom, the perennial subspecies, rare and known only from a few swampy areas of the coastline below  in Mendocino, Sonoma, and Marin Counties.

References

External links
Calflora Database: Sidalcea calycosa (Annual checkerbloom,  Checker mallow)
Jepson Manual eFlora (TJM2) treatment of Sidalcea calycosa
USDA Plants Profile for Sidalcea calycosa (annual checkerbloom)
UC CalPhotos gallery: Sidalcea calycosa

calycosa
Endemic flora of California
Flora of the Sierra Nevada (United States)
Natural history of the California chaparral and woodlands
Natural history of the California Coast Ranges
Natural history of the San Francisco Bay Area